The Judge and Jake Wyler is a 1972 American TV movie directed by David Lowell Rich. The teleplay was written by Richard Levinson, William Link, and David Shaw. It was produced by Universal Television and broadcast by NBC on December 2, 1972.

The title characters are a hypochondriac former judge who owns a private detective agency and her parolee partner. The two are hired by Alicia Dodd to investigate the alleged suicide of her father, whom she suspects was really a murder victim.

Production notes
The film was a pilot for a proposed weekly series that failed to make the network's schedule. Earlier that year, Bette Davis had starred in Madame Sin, a pilot for ABC that also failed to sell.

In 1973, the character of Judge Meredith resurfaced in the form of Lee Grant in the TV movie Partners in Crime, scripted by Shaw and directed by Jack Smight. This, too, was a pilot that went no further than its initial airing.

Cast
 Bette Davis as Judge Meredith
 Doug McClure as Jake Wyler
 Eric Braeden as Anton Granicek
 Joan Van Ark as Alicia Dodd
 Gary Conway as Frank Morrison
 Lou Jacobi as Lieutenant Wolfson
 Kent Smith as Robert Dodd

Principal production credits
 Producers: Jay Benson, Richard Levinson, William Link
 Original Music: Gil Melle
 Cinematography: William Margulies
 Art Direction: Alexander A. Mayer
 Costume Design: Burton Miller

References

External links

1970s English-language films
1970s American films
1972 television films
1972 films
1970s mystery drama films
NBC network original films
Fictional duos
Films directed by David Lowell Rich
American mystery drama films
Films scored by Gil Mellé